Adel Karasholi (Arabic: عادل قرشولي. born October 15, 1936) is a German and Arabic writer.

Life
Already a published poet in his youth, he founded a literary magazine in Damascus which was banned by the Syrian government. He then began working in a publishing house and, later, as a journal and radio editor. In 1957 he became a member of the Arab Writer's Union. When it was banned in 1959, Karasholi emigrated to Germany and subsequently lived in various areas of East and West Germany. In 1961 he began living permanently in Leipzig. He studied at the German Literary institute at Leipzig University where he did his doctorate on the work of Bertolt Brecht. From 1968 to 1993 he was a lecturer at Leipzig University. He is currently a freelance writer in Leipzig.

Adel Karasholi is the author of numerous essays and books of poetry in Arabic and (since the 60s) German, as well as a translator of prose, poetry and plays between the two languages. His translations into German from Arabic include works by Alfred Faraq and Mahmoud Darwish.

In 1980 Adel Karasholi became a member of the East German Writer's Union. Since 1990, Karasholi has belonged to the Union of German Writers and, since 1992 to the German P.E.N. Center. He won the Leipzig Prize for Artistic Achievement in 1985 and the Albert-von-Chamisso Prize in 1992.

Works in German
 Wie Seide aus Damaskus, Berlin 1968
 Umarmung der Meridiane, Halle 1978
 Brecht in arabischer Sicht, Berlin 1982
 Meine Geliebte kommt, Berlin 1983
 Daheim in der Fremde, Halle 1984
 Der Weinberg Erde, Leipzig 1986 (with Joachim Jansong)
 Wenn Damaskus nicht wäre, Munich 1992
 Also sprach Abdulla, Munich 1995
 Wie fern ist Palästina?, Leipzig 2003
 Wo du warst und wo du bist, Munich 2004

External links
 Excerpt from Thus Spoke Abdulla in English translation
 
 http://www.fremd-sein.de/autoren/kara_1.html
 http://www.culturebase.net/artist.php?826
 https://web.archive.org/web/20080724135936/http://www.karasholi.com/

1936 births
Living people
German people of Syrian descent
Syrian emigrants to Germany
German male writers
Immigrants to East Germany
Academic staff of Leipzig University